Ferdinand "Ferdl" Swatosch (11 May 1894 – 29 November 1974) was an Austrian football player and manager.

He played for 1. Simmeringer SC, SK Rapid Wien, Wiener Amateur-SV, SpVgg Sülz 07 and obtained 23 caps for Austria, scoring 18 goals.

References

External links
Profile
Profile

1894 births
1974 deaths
Austrian footballers
Austria international footballers
1. Simmeringer SC players
SK Rapid Wien players
FK Austria Wien players
1. FC Köln players
FC Mulhouse players
Ligue 1 players
Austrian expatriate footballers
Expatriate footballers in France
Austrian expatriate sportspeople in France
Austrian expatriate sportspeople in Germany
Expatriate football managers in Germany
Austrian football managers
Austrian expatriate football managers
FC Mulhouse managers
Borussia Dortmund managers
Arminia Bielefeld managers
FC Schalke 04 managers
Association football forwards
Borussia Neunkirchen managers